Carl Johan Arthur, Prince Bernadotte, Count of Wisborg,  (31 October 1916 – 5 May 2012) was the fourth son and fifth and youngest child of King Gustaf VI Adolf of Sweden and his first wife, Princess Margaret of Connaught. 

Bernadotte was born a Prince of Sweden and granted the title of Duke of Dalarna but renounced these titles to marry a commoner. He was a paternal uncle of King Carl XVI Gustaf of Sweden and a maternal uncle of Queens Margrethe II of Denmark and Anne-Marie of Greece. He was also the last surviving great-grandchild of Queen Victoria and her husband, Prince Albert.

Marriages and children
Bernadotte lost his succession rights to the Swedish throne and renounced his titles in 1946 when he married the journalist Elin Kerstin Margaretha Wijkmark (4 October 1910 – 11 September 1987), daughter of Henning Wijkmark and wife Elin Larsson in New York City on 19 February. As his unconstitutional marriage to Wijkmark - enskild mans dotter (daughter of a common man) - could not be approved by the Swedish government, Bernadotte knew he was giving up his Swedish titles and succession rights.

They adopted two children:
 Monica Kristina Margaretha Bernadotte (born 5 March 1948, adopted in 1951). Married on 16 January 1976 Count Johan Peder Bonde af Björnö (born 5 May 1950). They have three children and were divorced in 1997.
 Christian Carl Henning Bernadotte (born 3 December 1949, adopted in 1950). Married on 13 September 1980 Marianne Jenny (born 31 January 1958), daughter of Jacques Jenny and wife Caroline Yvonne Venter. They have three children.

The Bernadottes lived for some time in New York City, where he worked as the representative of the Anglo-Nordic Trading Company. They made friends with the film star Greta Garbo, who stayed with them in their Swedish home near Båstad.

On 29 September 1988, the widowed Bernadotte married Countess Gunnila Märtha Louise (Wachtmeister af Johannishus) Bussler (12 May 1923 – 12 September 2016) in Copenhagen and also became the stepfather of her two surviving children from her previous marriage.

Titles, styles, honours and arms

31 October 1916 – 19 February 1946: His Royal Highness Prince Carl Johan of Sweden, Duke of Dalarna
19 February 1946 – 2 July 1951: Carl Johan Bernadotte
2 July 1951 – 5 May 2012: Carl Johan Arthur, Prince Bernadotte, Count of Wisborg

When marrying on 19 February 1946 he lost his Swedish royal titles, i.e. Prince of Sweden and Duke of Dalarna. He subsequently assumed the surname Bernadotte, the name of the Swedish Royal Family.

On 2 July 1951, for himself, his wife and his marital descendants, he was admitted by Grand Duchess Charlotte (head of state at the time) into the Luxembourgois nobility with the title Count of Wisborg. and in that conferral was also made Carl Johan Arthur Prince Bernadotte.

Honours
Certain Swedish decorations were awarded at birth in 1916 and renounced in 1946.

National honours
  : Knight with Collar of the Royal Order of the Seraphim – Revoked
  : Commander Grand Cross with Collar of the Royal Order of the Sword – Revoked
  : Commander Grand Cross with Collar of the Royal Order of the Polar Star – Revoked and Reconferred (10 April 1952) 
  : Knight of the Royal Order of Charles XIII – Revoked
  : King Gustaf V's Jubilee Commemorative Medal (1928)
  : King Gustaf VI Adolf's Commemorative Medal (1967)
  : King Carl XVI Gustaf's Jubilee Commemorative Medal (1996)

Foreign honours
  : Knight Grand Cross of the Order of the Elephant
  : Grand Officer of the Order of the Quetzal

Arms

Ancestry
On 29 June 2011, he surpassed his elder brother, Sigvard (1907–2002), as the longest-lived of Queen Victoria's male descendants, a record he would hold until being surpassed by Prince Philip, Duke of Edinburgh on 13 December 2016. He was the last surviving great-grandchild of Queen Victoria of the United Kingdom, the last surviving child of Gustaf VI Adolf, and the last surviving grandchild of Gustaf V.

See also
 Descendants of Queen Victoria

References

External links

1916 births
2012 deaths
Carl Johan 1916
Carl Johan 1916
Commanders Grand Cross of the Order of the Sword
Commanders Grand Cross of the Order of the Polar Star
Knights of the Order of Charles XIII
Grand Officers of the Order of the Quetzal
People from Stockholm
Swedish people of British descent
Carl Johan
Disinherited European royalty
Burials at Kungliga begravningsplatsen
Carl Johan
Sons of kings